Stuart McIntosh (born 8 June 1975 in London) is a British slalom canoeist who competed in the 1990s and 2000s.

He won a bronze medal in the C1 team event at the 2006 ICF Canoe Slalom World Championships in Prague and two more bronze medals at the European Championships (1 individual and 1 in team event). He won four World Cup series medals, including a silver medal at the 2004 World Cup Final in Bourg St.-Maurice, France.

McIntosh also competed in two Summer Olympics in the C1 event, earning his best finish of eighth twice (2000, 2004). He was also a 'reserve' in 2008.

McIntosh moved to Australia after the end of his career. He has three children with his wife Melissa (née Grah), who was elected to the Australian parliament in 2019.

World Cup individual podiums

1 European Championship counting for World Cup points

References

Sports-reference.com

1975 births
English male canoeists
Canoeists at the 2000 Summer Olympics
Canoeists at the 2004 Summer Olympics
Living people
Olympic canoeists of Great Britain
Sportspeople from London
British male canoeists
Medalists at the ICF Canoe Slalom World Championships
English emigrants to Australia